Soulection is a Los Angeles-based music collective that serves as a platform and community for artists, musicians, and fans from across the world. DJ Joe Kay and artists Guillame '96' Bonte and Andre Power collaborated to establish the brand in 2011. Today, Soulection exists as an Apple Music 1 radio show on Beats1 Radio, an independent music label, festival, world-touring concert and clothing line. The brand defines itself as uniting a "borderless, genre-bending musical movement".

Founders

Joe Kay
Joe Kay is a Southern California native. He is a co-founder and current CEO and Head of Artists and Repertoire of Soulection. Kay started a musical compilation podcast out of his grandmother's basement known as "Illvibes" in the summer of 2007. Joe Kay transferred to California State University, Long Beach in 2011. A meeting with the program director and general manager of the university's radio station, KBeach Radio, secured Kay radio time that very same day.

Andre Power
Andre Power is a co-founder and current creative director of Soulection. Power attended art school in San Diego and was a listener of Kay's Illvibes podcast. After participating in the event as an artist, Power became involved with organizing San Diego's Art in the Park. In 2010, Power invited Kay to DJ at Art in the Park and soon after made Kay a resident at the event.

Guillame Bonte
Guillame Bonte is a French artist known as "96". He is a co-founder of Soulection. Bonte was an Internet friend of Joe Kay and Andre Power. Bonte is accredited with creating the Soulection logo. His initial role in Soulection was art director.

Early stages
Kay and Bonte initially conceptualized Soulection as a blog and platform for the community to arts and culture. After growing impatient to website development delays, the two created compilations of music they liked. Soulection ultimately formed as an extension of Kay's podcast, Illvibes. Kay envisioned two sides to Soulection: a radio show and original material released by Soulection. On January 24, 2011, the first show of Soulection Radio (Show #1) aired for an hour on KBeach Radio. The first Soulection compilation was released on the same day as well. With only a splash page and zip file of the radio show, they received 5000 downloads in their first compilation all through organic outreach. The release was a compilation of 29 different artists. After the 2011 Tōhoku earthquake and tsunami in Japan, Soulection was contacted by Australian producer Ta-ku. Ta-ku proposed that the beat tape he had recently made within 24 hours, be released through Soulection and the proceeds of the release be donated to tsunami relief. Their second release, 24, was released for free on Bandcamp with an option for donation. Soulection's fifth release, Mood by Evil Needle, became its best-selling release to date. The fourteen song album was released on October 31, 2011. Joe Kay says it was around the time of this release that the Soulection team decided to seriously pursue the expansion of the Soulection brand. Soulection continued to release music under the Soulection label, releasing over 30 albums by 2015.

Apple Music and Beats-1 Radio

In June 2015, Apple announced its streaming music service, Apple Music. Apple Music's first broadcasting station was called Beats 1 Radio. Beats 1 Radio was led by DJs Zane Lowe, Ebro Darden, and Julie Adenuga and was contributed to by artists such as Drake, Q-Tip, Pharrell Williams, Dr. Dre, and Elton John. Soulection was among the list of names chosen to serve as a tastemaker for the broadcast. The first Soulection radio show broadcast on Beats 1 Radio on July 4, 2015. The show aired their 500th episode on April 11, 2021.

The Soulection brand

Independent music label
Soulection has released 78 records including albums, singles, EPs, and compilations since 2011.Artists such as Sango, GoldLink, Sam Gellaitry, Monte Booker, IAMNOBODI, Tom Misch, and even popular streetwear brand Stussy have worked to release music with the label. 2021 releases under the Soulection label include Ari PenSmith's City Girl: Acoustic Performance, Jayla Darden's Exhausted My Options, Phabo's Soulquarius & Slippery, AYLØ's Clairsentience LIVE and three works from Lou Val: Tayo and the Dreamer, Eternal Sunshine, and Cruel Silence.

Experiences
Soulection also functions as a touring festival and concert attraction. The brand holds a monthly event, The Sound of Tomorrow, in Los Angeles. Their festival, dubbed "Soulection Experience", hosts a variety of artists and genres.  The group has been commissioned to perform in a variety of venues, as well. In 2013, Coachella invited the group to perform at the southern Californian festival. In 2015, Soulection performed to a sold-out crowd in the "Whale Room" displayed in The American Museum of Natural History in New York.

Merchandise line
Soulection has also developed a merchandise line of clothing apparel and lifestyle items. Around the time of their 2014 music compilation, Stussy and Soulection collaborated to release special edition t-shirts. In March 2015, they worked with Dutch brand Daily Paper to design and create 300 limited-edition windbreakers. Soulection estimates that about 60-70% of their overall revenue comes from merchandise and about 20-30% comes from selling music.

Current team

Discography

2011

2012

2013

2014

2015

2016

2017

2018

2019

2020

2021

References

2011 establishments in California
Organizations established in 2011
Music of Los Angeles
Organizations based in Los Angeles
Musical collectives
American brands